Liashur Sara or Liashur Saray may refer to:
 Liashur Sara-ye Olya
 Liashur Sara-ye Sofla
 Liashur Saray-e Ostad Vali